Helgi Jónas Guðfinnsson (born 18 April 1976) is an Icelandic basketball coach and former professional player. He spent the majority of his career with Grindavík where he won the Icelandic championship in 1996 and the Icelandic Cup in 1995, 1998 and 2006. He was twice named the Úrvalsdeild Domestic Player of the Year and once the Icelandic Basketball Men's Player of the Year. After his playing career came to an end, Helgi went into coaching and led Grindavík to the Icelandic Cup in 2011 and the  national championship in 2012.

Basketball

Playing career
He last played for ÍG in 2011 in the second-tier 1. deild karla, appearing two games where he averaged 31.0 points, 9.0 rebounds and 6.0 assists.

National team career
From 1995 to 2001, Helgi played 63 games for the Icelandic national basketball team.

Coaching career
In April 2010, Helgi signed a 3-year contract with Grindavík. He was voted the Úrvalsdeild coach of the year in 2012 after he led Grindavík to the Icelandic championship. After the season, he resigned from his post.

In April 2014, he signed a 2-year contract as the head coach of rival Úrvalsdeild club Keflavík. In November the same year, he was forced to step down as head coach due to heart problems.

In May 2019, Helgi returned to coaching when he was hired as an assistant coach to Daníel Guðni Guðmundsson in Grindavík.

Football
From 2002 to 2003, Helgi played 9 games in the Icelandic top-tier football league as well as appear in one cup game for Grindavík's football team.

References

External links
Icelandic statistics 2008-2011 at Icelandic Basketball Association

1976 births
Living people
Association footballers not categorized by position
Helgi Jonas Gudfinnsson
Helgi Jonas Gudfinnsson
Helgi Jonas Gudfinnsson
Helgi Jonas Gudfinnsson
Helgi Jonas Gudfinnsson
Helgi Jonas Gudfinnsson
Helgi Jonas Gudfinnsson
Helgi Jonas Gudfinnsson
Point guards
Shooting guards
Helgi Jonas Gudfinnsson
Helgi Jonas Gudfinnsson